Rusty Hicks is an American labor union activist and attorney serving as chair of the California Democratic Party. Hicks won the June 4, 2019, chairmanship election after the resignation of Eric C. Bauman.

Early life and education 
Hicks was born in Fort Worth, Texas. He earned a Bachelor of Arts in political science and government from Austin College, before moving to Los Angeles in 2003, where he earned a Juris Doctor from Loyola Law School.

Career 
Hicks worked on the Barack Obama 2008 presidential campaign as the California political director. Hicks also worked as a legislative aide to California Assembly members Mike Gordon and Ted Lieu. Hicks is a Lieutenant in the United States Navy Reserve and lives in Pasadena, California.

Prior to his role as chair, Hicks had served as the president of the Los Angeles County Federation of Labor since November 2014.

References 

Trade unionists from California
Austin College alumni
California Democratic Party chairs
Living people
Loyola Law School alumni
United States Navy reservists
Year of birth missing (living people)
American trade union leaders
People from Fort Worth, Texas